The Understudy is a 1922 American silent comedy film directed by William A. Seiter and starring Doris May, Wallace MacDonald and Christine Mayo.

Cast
 Doris May as Mary Neil
 Wallace MacDonald as Tom Manning
 Christine Mayo as Grace Lorimer
 Otis Harlan as Mr. Manning
 Arthur Hoyt as Cathbert Vane

References

Bibliography
 Munden, Kenneth White. The American Film Institute Catalog of Motion Pictures Produced in the United States, Part 1. University of California Press, 1997.

External links
 

1922 films
1922 comedy films
1920s English-language films
American silent feature films
Silent American comedy films
American black-and-white films
Films directed by William A. Seiter
Film Booking Offices of America films
1920s American films